Richard Riehle (born May 12, 1948) is an American character actor. He portrayed Walt Finnerty on Grounded for Life (2001–2005) and The Warden on The Young and the Restless (2007). He also appeared in over 200 films, including Glory (1989), The Fugitive (1993), Casino (1995), Lethal Weapon 4 (1998) and Office Space (1999).

Life and career
Riehle was born on May 12, 1948, in Menomonee Falls, Wisconsin, the son of Mary Margaret (née Walsh), a nurse, and Herbert John Riehle (1921–1961), an assistant postmaster. He attended the University of Notre Dame and then went on to complete an MFA at University of Minnesota. He began acting at the Meadow Brook Theatre in Rochester and was doing regional theatre in the Pacific Northwest when he got his very first film role in the John Wayne film Rooster Cogburn.

His television credits include Quantum Leap; Roseanne; Murder, She Wrote; L.A. Law; Ally McBeal; Buffy the Vampire Slayer; Chicago Hope; Diagnosis: Murder; Sabrina the Teenage Witch; The West Wing; ER; Married to the Kellys; Tremors; Boston Legal; Grounded for Life (45 episodes), and The Young and the Restless. Riehle has also guest-starred on three of the six Star Trek television series.

Filmography

Film

Television

Video games

References

External links

Actor Profile at industrycentral.net

1948 births
Living people
Male actors from Wisconsin
American male film actors
American male television actors
People from Menomonee Falls, Wisconsin
University of Notre Dame alumni